BMR are hardware stores located in Quebec, Ontario, New Brunswick, Nova Scotia, Prince Edward Island in Canada, and also in Saint Pierre and Miquelon, an overseas collectivity of France located on islands near Canada. BMR specializes in the distribution and sale of renovation products and household hardware.

Description 
The company distributes and sells renovation products and household hardware to homeowners and home builders. Their success can be attributed by the fact that their stores are warehouse styled for large and small market areas. Their major competitors are Home Hardware, Castle Building Centres, Home Depot and Rona/Réno-Dépôt.

Providing service throughout Quebec, Ontario, and the Maritimes, the company has more than 200 hardware stores which employ   persons. Their head office is located in Boucherville, Quebec.

References

External links 
 

Hardware stores of Canada
Retail companies established in 1967
Companies based in Boucherville
1967 establishments in Quebec